Chris Day (born 1975) is an English footballer.

Chris or Christopher Day may also refer to:

Chris Day (hepatologist) (born 1960), Vice-Chancellor of Newcastle University
Chris Day (basketball), basketball coach
Chris Crass, birth name of American anarchist activist

See also
Christian Day (born 1983), rugby union player